Dimitar Pantev (born 18 July 1989) is a Bulgarian footballer who currently plays as a goalkeeper for Sevlievo.

Career
In June 2018, Pantev joined Litex.

References

External links

1989 births
Living people
People from Gabrovo
Bulgarian footballers
First Professional Football League (Bulgaria) players
Second Professional Football League (Bulgaria) players
FC Yantra Gabrovo players
PFC Vidima-Rakovski Sevlievo players
PFC Akademik Svishtov players
PFC Spartak Pleven players
PFC Litex Lovech players
Association football goalkeepers